Brendan Creevey (born 18 February 1970) is an Australian cricketer. He played in 12 first-class and 31 List A matches for Queensland between 1996 and 2001.

See also
 List of Queensland first-class cricketers

References

External links
 

1970 births
Living people
Australian cricketers
Queensland cricketers
Cricketers from Queensland